Madrepora oculata, also called zigzag coral, is a stony coral that is found worldwide outside of the polar regions, growing in deep water at depths of 80–1500 meters. It was first described by Carl Linnaeus in his landmark 1758 10th edition of Systema Naturae. It is one of only 12 species of coral that are found worldwide, including in Subantarctic oceans. In some areas, such as in the Mediterranean Sea and the North-east Atlantic Ocean, it dominates communities of coral.

Description
The species is quite variable in its tendency to branch, its texture and color and other aspects, even within specimens in the same coral colony. It is bushy, growing in small colonies that form thickets, creating matrices that are fan-shaped and about 30 to 50 cm high. It has thick skeletal parts that grow in a lamellar pattern. As its skeleton is fragile and unable to sustain a large framework, it is usually found among stronger coral, such as Lophelia pertusa and Goniocorella dumosa, that offer protection. In areas where it dominates, it is usually found in rubble and debris rather than in coral reefs.

Madrepora oculata produces large amounts of mucus that is extracellular or outside the cell membranes. The mucus acts in a protective capacity to shield the coral skeleton from attacks of destructive pests.

Hypertrophy
The first instances of possible  cancer in coral were reported in a species of Madrepora in Hawaiian waters in which hypertrophied corallites were noted. Similarly hypertrophied corallites were described in colonies of Madrepora oculata near northwestern Australia and Japan, as well as in the Formosa Strait and other areas,  but have never been confirmed. A recent provisional reinterpretation is that these abnormal corallites are a form of internal gall, an abnormal swelling or growth caused by infection by a parasite, rather than a classical neoplasm.

References

External links

Oculinidae
Corals described in 1758
Taxa named by Carl Linnaeus